Freda Baffour Awuah (born 20 August 1993) popularly known as Freda Rhymz, is a Ghanaian rapper and songwriter from Sunyani in the Brong Ahafo Region of Ghana. She gained recognition when she entered the MTN Hitmaker Competition in 2017 and emerged as the winner of the competition.

Early life and career 
Freda Rhymz is the last born of 6 siblings. She received his early schooling at Sunyani's Glory Day Care and continued at Miracle Preparatory School through class four. She continued her studies at St Anthony of Padua, where she completed JHS, and Dormaa Senior High School, both in Sunyani, while continuing pursuing her passion for music. She graduated from Methodist University  with a degree in Fine Arts. Afrobeats, Hiphop, Hiplife, and Highlife are among the genres of music she creates. She has worked with artists including Pappy Kojo, Sista Afia, KelvynBoy and  D-Black.

Controversies 
After some linguistic sparring, Freda Rhymz got violent with rapper Sista Afia.

Singles

References 

1993 births
21st-century Ghanaian singers
Living people
Ghanaian highlife musicians
Ghanaian musicians